Lecithocera barbata is a moth in the family Lecithoceridae. It was described by Edward Meyrick in 1933. It is found in the former Orientale Province of the Democratic Republic of the Congo.

References

Moths described in 1933
barbata